Adam Ayles (1850 – 4 April 1912) was an Arctic explorer who served under George Nares as the Petty Officer of HMS Alert in the British Arctic Expedition.

Ayles was born of an unmarried mother at Marnhull, Dorset. He left school at age twelve and worked on a farm for a few years. He joined the British navy in 1867 and served in fighting in Ethiopia that year.  He served on the British Arctic Expedition from 1875 to 1876. He was the one member of the expedition that did not succumb to scurvy, and walked more than 100 miles across the ice to get relief to the others. The Ayles Ice Shelf and Mount Ayles were both named after him. It was noted at the time that he was the only teetotaller on the expedition, and Punch celebrated his achievement in verse:

A health to gallant Adam Ayles,
Who o'er the topers still prevails,
From scurvy safe and Arctic gales,
Through drinking only Adam's Ales.

Ayles later lived in New Zealand. He died suddenly while at his work tending the bowling green at the Rocky Nook Bowling Club in Auckland.

References 

1850 births
1912 deaths
Explorers of the Arctic
English polar explorers